Mount Fell is a mountain  west of Mount Hemmingsen in the northern part of the Werner Mountains in Palmer Land, Antarctica. It was mapped by the United States Geological Survey from ground surveys and U.S. Navy air photos, 1961–67, and was named by the Advisory Committee on Antarctic Names for Jack W. Fell, a biologist on the Eastwind in the cruise along the Antarctic Peninsula in the 1965–66 season.

References 

Mountains of Palmer Land